Grand Duchess Elizabeth Mikhailovna of Russia (Moscow, 26 May 1826 – Wiesbaden, 28 January 1845) was the second child and daughter of Grand Duke Mikhail Pavlovich of Russia and Princess Charlotte of Württemberg who took the name Elena Pavlovna upon her conversion to the Orthodox faith. Through her father, Elizabeth was a granddaughter of Tsar Paul I of Russia, and a niece of both Russian emperors Alexander I and Nicholas I.

Biography
Elizabeth, nicknamed "Lili", was born in the Kremlin in Moscow and she was named after her aunt who had died earlier that month, the Empress Elizabeth, wife of Emperor Alexander I and a close friend of her mother. She grew up with her other siblings in the Mikhailovsky Palace in Saint Petersburg. Elizabeth was said to be the prettiest among her sisters and, like her mother, Elena Pavlovna, she was graceful in manners and well-educated. By the end of 1843, Adolf, Duke of Nassau was visiting St. Petersburg and met Elizabeth for the first time. Adolf's stepmother was Princess Pauline of Württemberg, Elizabeth's maternal aunt. Adolf and Elizabeth fell in love and they eventually got married on 31 January 1844 in St. Petersburg. Elizabeth was 17 years old and Adolf was 26.

After the wedding, the couple stayed in Russia for some time until they moved to Germany and took up residence in Castle Biebrich in Wiesbaden. Elizabeth, now Duchess of Nassau, was popular among the people.

She and Adolf were happily married and the news that she was already pregnant with their first child brought great happiness to the couple. After only a year, Elizabeth died giving birth to a daughter, who also did not survive. The grief-stricken Adolf ordered the construction of a Russian Orthodox church - the St. Elizabeth's Church in Neroberg Park, Wiesbaden - to house her remains The location of the church on the hill was chosen by Adolf himself so that he could always have a view of the church from his residence. Elizabeth's sarcophagus can still be seen today inside the church.

Ancestry

|-

|-

1826 births
1845 deaths
House of Romanov
Russian grand duchesses
House of Nassau-Weilburg
German duchesses
Deaths in childbirth
19th-century people from the Russian Empire
19th-century women from the Russian Empire
Royal reburials